The Department of Homeland Security (DSN), also known as Department of National Security, is an advisory staff department of the  Spanish Prime Minister's Office  on matters of National Security and it is a permanent member of the Spanish National Security Council. This body was created to reinforce the organization of the President's office, by assisting the President of the Government in his responsibility leading the national security policy of Spain. It was created on 2012 by the Royal Decree 1119/2012, of July 20, by which the structure of the President's office of the Government is modified.

Functions
As an advisory body to the President of the Government, it is his responsibility to provide immediate, optimal and integral support in matters of national security for proper decision-making, as well as, among other functions:
 Prepare studies and reports on national security.
 Carry out early warning and monitoring of risks, threats and crisis situations in coordination with competent bodies and authorities.
 Assist the Chieff of Staff of the President in his capacity as secretary of the National Security Council as well as represent the Office of the President in the field of National Security.
 Analyze the evolution of risks and threats and their enhancers.
 Contribute to the elaboration of normative proposals on National Security.
 Collaborate in the elaboration of the Annual Reports of National Security.

In the area of crisis management, it provides a comprehensive and cross-cutting vision of crisis management and supports the activity carried out by the Specialized Committee in this area, and also includes, among other functions:
 Provide adequate support and coordination in the management of crisis situations.
 To maintain and ensure the proper functioning of the National Center for the Conduct of Crisis Situations and the special communications of the Presidency of the Government, as well as to protect its documentation.
 Direct and coordinate the execution of crisis management exercises planned by the Department, as well as those whose direction is required.
 Contribute to the preparation, maintenance and updating of the contingency plans and analyze the crisis scenarios in coordination with the competent bodies.

In the scope of the development of the strategic framework of National Security, it has coordinated the work for the elaboration of the National Security Strategy as well as the second level Strategies, specifically the National Maritime Safety Strategies, National Cybersecurity Strategies and National Energy Security.

Strucuture
 President of the Government
 Director of the Department.
 Director of Operations.
 Officies of the Department.

Directors
 Alfonso de Senillosa (23 July 2012 – 27 January 2018). Civilian.
 Cristina Ysasi-Ysasmendi (27 January 2018 – 9 June 2018). Civil servant.
 Miguel Ángel Ballesteros (19 June 2018 – present). Military.

See also
 Presidency of the Government
 National Intelligence Center
 CITCO

References

2012 establishments in Spain
Government agencies established in 2012
Spanish intelligence agencies
Government agencies of Spain
Intelligence analysis
Spanish Prime Minister's Office
National security of Spain
Intelligence analysis agencies